Moloch is a 1999 Russian biographical film, directed by Alexander Sokurov. The storyline was conceived from a screenplay written by Yuri Arabov and Marina Koreneva. It portrays Adolf Hitler living life in an unassuming manner during an abrupt journey to the Bavarian Alps. The film stars actors Leonid Mozgovoy, Yelena Rufanova, Vladimir Bogdanov, and Leonid Sokol in principal roles. Moloch explores companionship, intimacy and dictatorship.

A joint collective effort to commit to the film's production was made by a number of studios, including Arte, Fabrica, Fusion Product, Goskino and Lenfilm Studio. It was commercially distributed by Koch Lorber Films. Following its release, the film was entered into the 1999 Cannes Film Festival and won other awards selections, including those from the Russian Guild of Film Critics Awards. The film was generally met with mixed critical reviews before its initial screening in 1999.

Plot
In the spring of 1942, a few months before the notorious Battle of Stalingrad, Adolf Hitler (Leonid Mozgovoy) retires to his secluded Berghof Retreat, on a remote hilltop of the Bavarian Alps, within Berchtesgaden in Bavaria, to unite with his long-time female companion Eva Braun (Yelena Rufanova). At the residence, Braun spends her spare time with trivial pursuits such as whimsically dancing in the nude, humming to military-style marching band music, and rummaging through Hitler's personal belongings. Later, Braun is thrilled to learn that her beloved "Adi", as she affectionately calls him, will be joining her for a visit. Hitler is accompanied by guests Joseph Goebbels (Leonid Sokol), Magda Goebbels (Yelena Spiridonova), Martin Bormann (Vladimir Bogdanov), and a priest (Anatoli Shvedersky) for conversation and playful banter.

During his stop-over, Hitler raves and rants on topics ranging from food, health, and climate change to wartime politics. After roaming through the mountainous landscape, Hitler is triumphant upon hearing of Germany's military victories. In a scene of political satire, he claims to have never heard of the Auschwitz concentration camp. Towards the end of Hitler's visit, Braun reminds him that no one can escape death or is infallible in an attempt to expose a hidden weakness within him as he embarks with his motorcade to continue Nazi Germany's military campaign.

Cast
Leonid Mozgovoy as Adolf Hitler
Yelena Rufanova as Eva Braun
Vladimir Bogdanov as Martin Bormann
Leonid Sokol as Joseph Goebbels
Yelena Spiridonova as Magda Goebbels
Anatoli Shvedersky as the Priest

Production

Filming
Directed by Russian filmmaker Alexander Sokurov, the film is the first in Sokurov's tetralogy of power. It was succeeded by Taurus (2000), about Vladimir Lenin, The Sun (2005), involving Japanese emperor Hirohito, and Faust (2011), based on the old German legend Faust. For production, Sokurov employed Russian actors from Saint Petersburg to shoot Moloch, but their voices were later dubbed by German theater actors from Berlin.

Reception

Critical response
Critical reaction to the film was mixed. Among reviews, Derek Elley of Variety noted, "There are no new revelations in this portrayal of an arrogant madman and his sycophants, and though impressive at first, Sokurov's glacial treatment, with its deliberately soft-focus look, pales after a while." More enthusiastically, Jim Hoberman of The Village Voice wrote, "Moloch is lurid without being commercial. Evoking the German romantic landscape he synthesized for Mother and Son, Sokurov places his characteristic understatement at the service of borderline kitsch." Likewise, Jason Anderson of Eye Weekly gave the film a five-star rating, commenting, "Though he hopes to extract the man from the mythology, he doesn't merely humanize a figure in any conventional sense, as Downfall did to Hitler with troubling results."

Accolades
The film won four awards at the 1999 Russian Guild of Film Critics Awards, including; Best Actor, Best Actress, Best Cinematography and Best Script. At the 1999 Cannes Film Festival, the film won the Best Screenplay Award. It was also chosen as Russia's official Best Foreign Language Film submission at the 72nd Academy Awards, but did not manage to receive a nomination.

References

External links
Official Website

1999 films
Films set in 1942
Films set in the Alps
Films set in Bavaria
Films about Adolf Hitler
Films directed by Alexander Sokurov
1990s German-language films
Russian satirical films
Russian political satire films
Cultural depictions of Adolf Hitler
Cultural depictions of Joseph Goebbels
Cultural depictions of Eva Braun
Russian World War II films